RAF Hornby Hall was a Royal Air Force satellite landing ground located near Brougham,  east of Penrith, Cumbria and  north west of Appleby-in-Westmorland, Cumbria, England.

History

The airfield was used by No. 22 Maintenance Unit RAF (MU) at RAF Silloth but changed to No. 12 MU at RAF Kirkbride.

The landing ground was also temporarily operated by No. 18 MU at RAF Dumfries sometime between July and September 1940.

Aircraft operated
 Fairey Battles
 Bristol Blenheims
 Blackburn Bothas
 Lockheed Hudsons

See also
 List of former Royal Air Force stations
 List of Royal Air Force Maintenance units

References

Royal Air Force stations in Cumbria
Royal Air Force satellite landing grounds